Darren Murray (born April 2, 1991 in Cape Town) is a South African swimmer. Qualified for the 2012 Summer Olympics as the first person of colour to represent South Africa in swimming at the Olympics.  He competed in the Men's 200 metre backstroke, finishing in 25th place overall in the heats, failing to qualify for the semifinals.

Murray has also competed at the 2008 and 2010 African Swimming Championships, the 2009, 2011 and 2013 World Aquatics Championships, the 2012 FINA World Swimming Championships (25 m), the 2011 All-Africa Games, and the 2014 Commonwealth Games.

References

External links
 
 
 
 
 
 

1991 births
Living people
Sportspeople from Cape Town
South African male swimmers
Male backstroke swimmers
Olympic swimmers of South Africa
Swimmers at the 2012 Summer Olympics
African Games medalists in swimming
African Games gold medalists for South Africa
African Games silver medalists for South Africa
Commonwealth Games competitors for South Africa
Swimmers at the 2014 Commonwealth Games
Competitors at the 2011 All-Africa Games
21st-century South African people
20th-century South African people